Allin Township is located in McLean County, Illinois. As of the 2010 census, its population was 919 and it contained 389 housing units. Allin Township was originally named Mosquito Grove Township, but changed its name on March 4, 1867. The township bears the name of James Allin, a promoter of Bloomington, Illinois.

Geography

Demographics

References

External links
City-data.com
Illinois State Archives

Townships in McLean County, Illinois
Populated places established in 1867
Townships in Illinois
1867 establishments in Illinois